Minuscule 536 (in the Gregory-Aland numbering), δ 264 (in Soden's numbering), is a Greek minuscule manuscript of the New Testament, on parchment. Palaeographically it has been assigned to the 13th century. 
Scrivener labeled it by number 549.
Several pages of the manuscript were lost. There are incomplete marginalia. The manuscript is available in a digital form on the internet.

Description 
It is "a very curious volume in ancient binding with two metal plates on the covers much resembling that of B-C. I. 7". The codex contains a complete text of the Gospels, Acts of the Apostles, and Pauline epistles on 174 parchment leaves (size ) with some additional material. It has only one lacuna (Acts 26:24-28:31). The lacking material was supplemented by another, but contemporary hand. The leaf after 63 is not numbered. The pages 127 recto and 127 verso are accompanied by horizontal lines in margin. The leaves 146-147 are written vertically.

The text is written one column per page, 26–31 lines per page, in a very minute hand. The large initial letters are decorated and in colours, the small initials are in red. It has decorated headpieces before each biblical book. The iota subscript is found twice only, and the error of itacism is quite rare.
The writing being unusually full of abbreviations. The Old Testament quotations are marked by inverted comma (>).

There is also a division according to the smaller Ammonian Sections, but there are no references to the Eusebian Canons.
References to the Eusebian Canons are noted only on one page of the codex. It has some scholia on Matthew 5 (folio 11 verso and folio 12 recto).

Other verses of Gregory precede Mark and Luke, and follow John. There are no chapter divisions in the Acts, but a few capitals in red. Each book is preceded by decorated headpieces.

Text 
The Greek text of the Gospels has many of the Byzantine readings but its text is not entirely Byzantine. Hermann von Soden classified it as part of the textual family Kr, but it was not confirmed by Aland and Wisse. Aland did not place it in any category.

According to the Claremont Profile Method it has an eclectic text in Gospel of Luke. In Luke 1 it has mixed Byzantine text, in Luke 10 it represents textual cluster Family Π200, and in Luke 20 it belongs to the textual family Kx. In the Acts its text is very close to the textual family 1739.

According to Scrivener the variations from the text of majority are not numerous or remarkable.

History 

Of the history of the codex 536 nothing is known until the year 1864. In 1864, the manuscript was purchased from a dealer at Janina in Epirus, by Angela Burdett-Coutts (1814–1906), a philanthropist, together with other Greek manuscripts (among them codices 532–546). They were transported to England in 1870/71.

The manuscript was presented by Burdett-Coutts to Sir Roger Cholmely's School, and was housed at the Highgate (Burdett-Coutts II. 7), in London. It was examined and collated by Scrivener. In 1922 it was purchased for the library of the University of Michigan. The manuscript was described by K. W. Clark in 1937.

It was added to the list of the New Testament minuscule manuscripts by F. H. A. Scrivener (549) and C. R. Gregory (536). Gregory saw it in 1883.

It is currently housed at the University of Michigan (Ms. Inv. No. 24) in Ann Arbor.

Gallery

See also 

 List of New Testament minuscules
 Biblical manuscript
 Textual criticism

References

Further reading 
 F. H. A. Scrivener, Adversaria Critica Sacra: With a Short Explanatory Introduction (Cambridge, 1893), p. XLII. (as i)
 Kenneth W. Clark, A Descriptive Catalogue of Greek New Testament Manuscripts in America (Chicago, 1937), pp. 295–297.

External links 

 Images of the minuscule 536 at the CSNTM
 Minuscule 536 at the Encyclopedia of Textual Criticism

Greek New Testament minuscules
13th-century biblical manuscripts
Illuminated biblical manuscripts
University of Michigan